The 1915 Michigan State Normal Normalites football team represented Michigan State Normal College (later renamed Eastern Michigan University) during the 1915 college football season.  The team compiled a record of 4–2–1, shut out five of their seven opponents (including a scoreless tie with the Michigan Wolverines freshman team), and outscored their opponents by a combined total of 154 to 25. John B. Hartman was the team captain.

Elmer Mitchell, formerly a high school coach in Grand Rapids, was hired to coach the school's football team in May 1915. At the start of fall practice, 60 students tried out for the football team, the largest number in school history up to that time. As the team lacked any players weighing 200 pounds or more, coach Mitchell was compelled to build his team around speed.

Schedule

References

Michigan State Normal
Eastern Michigan Eagles football seasons
Michigan State Normal Normalites football